The Voice Senior (season 1) began airing on 7 December 2019 on TVP 2. It aired on Saturdays at 20:05 and 21:10. Based on the original The Voice Senior, it has aired one season and aims to find currently unsigned singing talent (solo or duets, professional and amateur) contested by aspiring singers, age 60 or over, drawn from public auditions. The winner will be determined by television viewers voting by telephone, SMS.

The series employs a panel of four coaches who critique the artists' performances and guide their teams of selected artists through the remainder of the season. They also compete to ensure that their act wins the competition, thus making them the winning coach. The original panel featured Marek Piekarczyk, Urszula Dudziak, Alicja Majewska and Andrzej Piaseczny.

Coaches

The judges were Andrzej Piaseczny, Alicja Majewska, Urszula Dudziak and Marek Piekarczyk.

Presenters
Tomasz Kammel and Marta Manowska hosted the show with Janina Busk as V-Reporter.

Teams
Color key

Blind auditions
Color keys

Episode 1 (December 7, 2019)

Episode 2 (December 7, 2019)

Episode 3 (December 14, 2019)

Episode 4 (December 14, 2019)

Sing Off (Merry Christmas) 
Sing Off round aired on December 21, 2019.

The top 8 contestants then moved on to the "Live Season Final."

Colour key

Final 

Colour key:

References

External links
Official website
VOD The Voice Senior
The Voice Senior TVP 2 - Premiera 
The Voice Senior nowe Show TVP 2
Prowadzący i Trenerzy The Voice Senior

The Voice of Poland